Wendy Susan Schmidt (née Boyle) is an American businesswoman and philanthropist. She is the wife of Eric Schmidt, the former CEO of Google, whom she met in graduate school at the University of California, Berkeley.

She is the president of the Schmidt Family Foundation, holding over $1 billion in philanthropic assets.

Biography
She was born in 1955 in Orange, New Jersey. Her parents owned an interior design firm, Boyle Design Associates.

She graduated from Smith College in 1977 and attended graduate school at Berkeley. While there, she met Eric Schmidt, then a doctoral student in computer science, and edited his thesis. They married in June 1980.

After graduating in 1981 with a master's degree in journalism, she joined the marketing department of Sun Microsystems, where Eric Schmidt later worked as well. She left Sun in 1986 to start an interior design firm, which she ran for 16 years. Wendy and Eric Schmidt had two daughters, Sophie and Alison. Alison died in 2017 from an illness.

Philanthropy 

In 2005, Schmidt became a trustee of the Natural Resources Defense Council (NRDC) and founded the 11th Hour Project to raise awareness about climate change and global warming.
In 2006, Wendy and Eric Schmidt established the Schmidt Family Foundation to address issues of sustainability and the responsible use of natural resources. She is the president of the foundation and directs its grant making. As a yachtswoman, Schmidt has taken a personal interest in promoting some of the 11th Hour Project's ocean awareness programs through competitive sailing.

After the establishment of the foundation, The 11th Hour Project became its main direct charitable program. ReMain Nantucket, founded in 2007 by Wendy Schmidt, is a program area of The Schmidt Family Foundation focused on the economic, social, and environmental vitality of downtown Nantucket, Massachusetts.

In 2009, Wendy and Eric Schmidt created the $25 million Schmidt Transformative Technology Fund at Princeton University to support research and technology in the natural sciences and engineering. The Fund awarded $1.2 million in grants in 2010 and $1.7 million in grants in 2012.

In 2010, through the Schmidt Family Foundation, she offered the prize purse of the Wendy Schmidt Oil Cleanup X Challenge, a challenge award for the efficient capturing of crude oil from seawater motivated by the Deepwater Horizon oil spill.

Schmidt has supported propositions and politicians in California. She gave $1 million to Proposition 87, a failed 2006 initiative to raise taxes on oil companies to pay for research and incentives to support alternative energy; $50,000 to the Prevention of Farm Animal Cruelty Act, which was approved by voters; and $25,900 to Jerry Brown’s successful campaign for Governor of California.

In 2015, Schmidt initiated the 'Wendy Schmidt Ocean Health XPRIZE': a global competition that awarded $2 million to scientists and engineers who demonstrated excellence in the creation of new accurate and affordable ocean acidification technology.  The Schmidt Family Foundation announced a $10 million grant to the Monterey Bay Aquarium in February of 2015. The grant enabled the aquarium to collaborate with industry leaders and address growing challenges in global fisheries.

In partnership with the Rhodes Trust, Wendy and Eric Schmidt introduced Schmidt Science Fellows in 2018: a $25 million initiative aimed at driving scientific leadership in a unique post-doctoral program. The Fellowship equips participants with tools and expertise to drive new discoveries to benefit human and planetary health.

In 2019, Wendy and Eric Schmidt funded the rebuilding and expansion of historic Guyot Hall at Princeton University’s Department of Computer Science. The new building will be renamed ‘Eric and Wendy Schmidt Hall’, with construction scheduled to be complete in 2026.

In April 2020, the Schmidt Ocean Institute, established and supported by Wendy and Eric Schmidt, discovered the longest siphonophore off the coast of Australia. A research team aboard the research vessel Falkor utilized a remotely piloted underwater robot, SuBastian, in discovery of an additional 30 new underwater species. Later that year, on October 20, the team aboard Falkor utilized SuBastian to map the underwater landscape off the coast of Australia and discovered a detached coral reef taller than the Eiffel Tower, estimated to be around 20 million years old.

In November 2020, Wendy and Eric Schmidt’s philanthropic initiative Schmidt Futures (in collaboration with Rhodes Trust) announced a talent program called Rise. Rise’s mission aims to cultivate and support young people from around the world in the form of funding for internships or scholarships for higher education.

As co-founders of the Schmidt Family Foundation, Wendy and Eric Schmidt contributed a $5 million professorship endowment to Princeton University in December 2020. The new Eric and Wendy Schmidt Professor of Indigenous Studies expands interdisciplinary research and teaching of Indigenous communities around the world.

She serves on the board of Climate Central. She has also served on the America's Cup Organizing Committee in San Francisco.

References

External links 
 
 
Wendy Schmidt biography at 11th Hour Project official website
About Wendy Schmidt web

1955 births
Living people
Smith College alumni
University of California, Berkeley alumni
People from Orange, New Jersey
American women in business
Sun Microsystems people
American philanthropists
People from Atherton, California
21st-century American women